Alma Fiesta (Spanish trsl: Festival of the Soul) is the annual socio-cultural festival of the Indian Institute of Technology in Bhubaneswar. It is a three-day-long event usually held during the second week of January every year. The first edition of Alma Fiesta took place in 2010. It was inaugurated by Naveen Patnaik, Chief Minister of Odisha.

Introduction
Alma Fiesta, the socio-cultural festival of IIT Bhubaneswar is conducted solely by the efforts of the students of IIT Bhubaneswar. All the activities of the fest such as Marketing, Publicity, Events management, Design and Decoration, is managed by the students.

Events

Star Nites 
Alma Fiesta organizes three mega star nites, one on each of the three evenings of the fest.
The three shows include :
Leela
Leela is the Indian Classical Music/Dance show.

Head Bang
Headbang is the heavy-metal star nite.

Lamhe
Lamhe is the Bollywood musical night of Alma. Alma Fiesta 2011 has played host to Krishna Beura and the next edition witnessed a performance by Bandish. Last year saw a performance by Nikhil D'souza, a Bollywood playback singer. Hindi poet Kumar Vishwas.

Competitive Events 
At Alma Fiesta, competitions cover art, music, dance, and drama. Euphony, the band competition witnesses bands from all over the country.

Literary Events 
Perspective - The social case study competition. Presented in association with the SNSMT. The winner is awarded SNSMT-IIT BBSR Social Change Maker Award. The award was won by Ipsit Bibhudarshi and Barsha Behera of IGIT Sarang for the year 2012.
Litspree - Anagrams, charades, extempore, spelling bee and crosswords
Gone in Sixty Seconds - The Alma Fiesta version of the single minute extempore

Fine Arts events 
Leaf It Up - The leaf collage competition
Shadez - An event for pencil sketching
Blind Strokes - A blind folded drawing competition
Trash Can Novelties - An event to create art by recycling junk.

Other events 
Alma Fiesta Youth Quiz - A general quizzing event
Run against the AIDS - A youth marathon to spread awareness against AIDS

Model United Nations(MUN) 
Model United Nations involves researching, public speaking, debating, and writing skills, in addition to critical thinking, teamwork, and leadership abilities. Participants in Model UN conferences, known as delegates, are placed in committees and assigned countries, or occasionally other organizations or political figures, where they represent members of that body.

References

External links
 Alma Fiesta - Official website
 Alma Fiesta - Official Facebook page
 Alma Fiesta 2013 - Official teaser

Indian Institutes of Technology student life
Indian Institutes of Technology festivals
2010 establishments in Orissa
Festivals established in 2010